The 2019 USA Track & Field Outdoor Championships were held at Drake Stadium on the campus of Drake University in Des Moines, Iowa. Organized by USA Track & Field, the four-day competition took place from July 25–28 and served as the national championships in track and field for the United States.

Men's results
Key:

Men track events

Men field events

Women's results
Key:

Women track events

Women field events

Masters exhibition events

International selection

The 2019 USA Track & Field Outdoor Championships serve as the selection meet for United States representatives in international competitions, including the 2019 World Championships in Athletics. In order to be entered, athletes needed to achieve a qualifying standard mark and place in the top 3 in their event. The United States team, as managed by USATF, can also bring a qualified back up athlete in case one of the team members is unable to perform. In their qualification standards, the IAAF allows the option to add athletes based on their worldwide ranking.

Additionally, defending world champions and 2019 Diamond League champions receive byes into the World Championships.

A database was formed to illustrate how International Federations qualified and selected the athletes to represent their countries at the 2019 World Athletics Championships.

Defending 2017 World Champions
 Christian Taylor - triple jump
 Justin Gatlin - 100 m
 Sam Kendricks - pole vault
 Phyllis Francis - 400 m
 Tori Bowie - 100 m
 Kori Carter - 400 m hurdles
 Emma Coburn - 3000 m steeplechase
 Brittney Reese - long jump

Since some of these athletes also placed top three in these championships, the following fourth place athletes will also qualify:
 Tori Bowie – long jump
 Zach Bradford – pole vault
 Allie Ostrander – 3000 m steeplechase

2019 Diamond League Champions
To be determined at the Weltklasse Zürich on 29 August, and at the Memorial Van Damme in Brussels on 6 September.

American champions in Zurich were:
 Noah Lyles 100 meters, no change due to Gatlin
 Donavan Brazier 800 meters, possibly opening up a spot for 4th place Isaiah Harris, who achieved a World Championship qualifying time on August 27 in Rovereto.
 Sam Kendricks pole vault, no change
 Sydney McLaughlin 400 meters hurdles, no change due to Carter
American champions in Brussels were:
 Noah Lyles 200 meters, since Ameer Webb did not achieve the 20.40 qualifying mark, he should be replaced by Rodney Rowe.  With Lyles getting a wild card spot, the fourth spot would be Kenny Bednarek who pulled up in the championship race but was credited with finishing
 Michael Norman 400 meters, opening up an individual spot for 4th place Vernon Norwood who is already on the relay
 Christian Taylor triple jump, no change

Additionally qualified
Mason Finley 7th place in discus has the world qualifying standard
Keenon Laine was ranked #27 in the high jump, and was 6th with 2.21 m at the USA Championships.
Deadline rankings:
While not achieving a qualifying mark, Michael Shuey was ranked #29 and Riley Dolezal was ranked #30 in the javelin throw on September 6 and should be invited based on their being ranked within the field minimums.  Also potentially invited:
Chari Hawkins was ranked #17 in the heptathlon
Harrison Williams was ranked #18 in the decathlon
Ja'Mari Ward was in a 4 way tie for the 32nd and final spot in the long jump

Qualification
USA Track & Field sets minimum performances standards for entry into the national championships. In order to merit entry into the championships, an athlete must meet that standard, or better, within a set time frame prior to the competition. For the 10,000 m, 20,000 m race walk, and combined events the qualifying window was from January 1, 2018 – July 21, 2019. For all other events the qualifying window was June 1, 2018 – July 21, 2019. The organisers also set a maximum number of entrants and rounds for each event.

There are also automatic qualifying criteria outside of the entry standards. Athletes who are the reigning indoor or outdoor national champion are automatically qualified to enter that event. Athletes who meet the "A" standard for entry into the previous Olympic Games or World Championships in Athletics receive automatic entry, as do any athletes who placed in the top three of their event at the 2018 USA Outdoor Track and Field Championships.

Non-American athletes may compete as invited guests only and their performances may not count towards the national results nor international team selection. Athletes must have United States citizenship to be selected to represent the nation, else non-citizens must receive approval from the Track & Field Committee and be due to gain United States citizenship prior to the international meet that the national championships is selecting for.

For events over distances from 100 m to 800 m, performances will only be accepted if fully automatic timing (FAT) is used. For performances beyond that distance, FAT times are also used, but in the event that the athlete has not recorded a FAT performance, a manually recorded time may be used.

Schedule
The competition took place from July 25–28.

References

Results
USATF Championships - Drake Stadium, Des Moines Results. Flash Results.

USA Outdoor Track and Field Championships
USA Outdoors
Track, Outdoor
Sports in Des Moines, Iowa
USA Outdoor Track and Field Championships
Track and field in Iowa